Ruth Closius-Neudeck was a Schutzstaffel (SS) supervisor at a Nazi concentration camp complex from December 1944 until March 1945. She was executed for war crimes.

Early life
Ruth Closius was born in Breslau, Germany (now Wrocław, Poland). She later married and was known as Ruth Neudeck or Ruth Closius-Neudeck.

Camp work
In July 1944, she arrived at the Ravensbrück concentration camp to begin her training to be a camp guard. Neudeck soon began impressing her superiors with her unbending brutality towards the female prisoners, resulting in her promotion to the rank of Blockführerin (Barrack Overseer) in late July 1944.

In the Ravensbrück camp, she was known as one of the most ruthless female guards. Former French prisoner Geneviève de Gaulle-Anthonioz commented after the war that she had seen Neudeck "cut the throat of an inmate with the sharp edge of her shovel". In December 1944, she was promoted to the rank of Oberaufseherin, and moved to the Uckermark extermination complex down the road from Ravensbrück. There she involved herself in the selection and execution of over 5,000 women and children. The prisoners were mistreated by Neudeck or her fellow SS Aufseherinnen. In March 1945, Neudeck became head of the Barth subcamp.

Capture and execution
In late April 1945, she fled the camp but was later captured and detained in prison while the British Army investigated the allegations against her. In April 1948, she stood accused at the third Ravensbrück trial, along with other Schutzstaffel (SS) women. The 28-year-old former SS supervisor admitted to the accusations of murder and maltreatment made against her.

The British court found Neudeck guilty of war crimes and sentenced her to death by hanging. On 29 July 1948, she was executed by British executioner Albert Pierrepoint on the gallows at Hamelin Prison.

See also
 Female guards in Nazi concentration camps

References

Sources

External links
 

1920 births
1948 deaths
Hamburg Ravensbrück trials executions
Holocaust perpetrators in Germany
Executed German women
Military personnel from Wrocław
People from the Province of Lower Silesia
Female guards in Nazi concentration camps
Executed mass murderers